The 2009–10 season was the 108th season of competitive football in Italy.

Events
August 23, 2009 – Serie A season began.

Honours

National team

League tables

Serie A

Serie B

Inter Milan

UEFA Champions League

Group stage

Knockout phase

Round of 16

Quarter-finals

Semi-finals

Final

Deaths
September 18, 2009 — Brian Filipi, 20, Ravenna midfielder and Albania youth international, killed in a car accident.
October 13, 2009 — Massimo Mattolini, 56, former Serie A goalkeeper with Fiorentina and Napoli, Coppa Italia winner in 1975, kidney failure.
November 10, 2009 — Flora Viola, 86, widow of late Roma President Dino Viola, and club chairwoman herself during the year 1991.
December 26, 2009 — Giuseppe Chiappella, 85, former midfielder, 1955–56 Serie A winner with Fiorentina, Italian international footballer, and later manager for Fiorentina and Internazionale.
March 10, 2010 — Tonino Carino, 65, popular Italian RAI journalist who was active in football, best famous for his coverage of Ascoli games during the club's period in the Serie A in the 1980s and 1990s.
March 20, 2010 — Naim Krieziu, 92, Albanian former striker/winger, one of the two last surviving members with Amedeo Amadei of the Roma team who won the club's first Italian title in 1942.
April 3, 2010 - Maurizio Mosca, 69, popular Italian journalist and TV presenter who was active in football.

References

 
Seasons in Italian football
2009 in Italian sport
2009 in association football
2010 in Italian sport
2010 in association football